The 2001–02 season of the Venezuelan Primera División, the top category of Venezuelan football, was played by 10 teams. The national champions were Nacional Táchira.

Torneo Apertura

Torneo Clausura

Final Playoff

External links
Venezuela 2001-02 season at RSSSF

Venezuelan Primera División seasons
Ven
Ven
2001–02 in Venezuelan football